Amigo Spiele is a German board and card game publisher. Many of their games have won Spiel des Jahres awards, and many have been published in English by Rio Grande Games.

Notable games

 6 nimmt! (also Take 6!)
 Bohnanza
 Café International
 Dungeons & Dragons
 Diskwars (Tabletop)
 Elfenland
 Fluxx
 Der Große Dalmuti
 Guillotine
 
 
 
 
 Piratenbucht, a.k.a. Pirate's Cove
 
 Rage
 
 Robo Rally
 Saboteur (game)
 
 
 Uno (card game)

External links
 

Board game publishing companies